Gyrotrema is a genus of lichenized fungi in the family Graphidaceae. There are six species assigned to the genus:
 Gyrotrema album
 Gyrotrema aurantiacum
 Gyrotrema flavum
 Gyrotrema papillatum
 Gyrotrema sinuosum
 Gyrotrema wirthii

References

Ostropales
Lichen genera
Ostropales genera
Taxa described in 2006